

Buildings and structures

Buildings

 

 1560
 Palladian villas of the Veneto: Villa Foscari is completed and Villa Barbaro is probably begun.
 Wat Xieng Thong Buddhist temple at Luang Prabang in the kingdom of Lan Xang (modern-day Laos) is completed.
 Construction of the Uffizi in Florence, designed by Giorgio Vasari, begins.
 Construction of Mexico City Cathedral begins.
 Reconstruction of Poznań Town Hall in Poland by Giovanni Battista di Quadro is completed.
 1561
 Saint Basil's Cathedral, Moscow, designed by Postnik Yakovlev, is completed.
 The Tian Yi Ge library in Ningbo (Ming dynasty China) is established.
 1562–64
 Façade of the church of San Francesco della Vigna in Venice, designed by Andrea Palladio, is built.
 Church of Santa Maria degli Angeli e dei Martiri in Rome, designed by Michelangelo, is adapted from the Baths of Diocletian.
 1562–67 – Church of San Pedro and San Pablo, Zacatlán, Sierra Norte de Puebla, Mexico, is built.
 1562 – Dome of Basilica of Our Lady of Humility, Pistoia, Tuscany, designed by Giorgio Vasari, is built.
 1563
 Villa Badoer, one of the Palladian villas of the Veneto designed by Andrea Palladio in 1556, is completed.
 Construction of El Escorial palace in Spain, designed by Juan de Herrera, begins (completed 1584).
 Construction of Charlton Park House in England by Henry Knyvet for himself begins (completed 1607).
 1564
 Vasari Corridor in Florence, designed by Giorgio Vasari, is built.
 Somersal Herbert Hall near Ashbourne, Derbyshire, England, is built.
 1565–66
 Church of San Giorgio Maggiore in Venice is designed by Palladio and construction begins.
 Temple of Haw Phra Kaew in Vientiane, Laos, is built.
 1565–69 – Church of Santo Stefano dei Cavalieri, Pisa, designed by Giorgio Vasari, is built.
 1565–72 – Humayun's Tomb in Delhi, India is built, probably also including the Afsarwala tomb.
 1566 – Construction of the city of Valletta on Malta, designed by Francesco Laparelli, begins (March 28).
 1566–67 – "Stari Most" bridge crossing the Neretva at Mostar in the Ottoman Empire, built by Mimar Hayruddin, is completed.

 1567
 First Royal Exchange, London, completed as the Bourse.
 Construction of Villa Capra "La Rotonda" in Vicenza, designed by Andrea Palladio, begins.
 1568
 The Palace of Charles V in Madrid, Spain, is completed.
 Construction begins of:
 Church of the Gesù in Rome, designed by Giacomo Barozzi da Vignola (June 26).
 Selimiye Mosque in Edirne, Turkey, designed by Mimar Sinan (completed 1574).
 Longleat House in England, designed by Robert Smythson.

Events
 1562: Giacomo Barozzi da Vignola – Publication of Regola delli cinque ordini d'architettura (Rules of the Five Orders of Architecture).
 1563: John Shute – Publication of The First and Chief Groundes of Architecture, the first work in English on architecture.
 1568: Giorgio Vasari – Second, enlarged, edition published of Le Vite delle più eccellenti pittori, scultori, ed architettori (Lives of the Most Excellent Painters, Sculptors, and Architects).

Births
 1560 – Lieven de Key, Dutch architect (died 1627)

Deaths
 1563
 John Shute, English architect, architectural writer and miniature painter
 Diego Siloe, Spanish Renaissance architect and sculptor (born 1490)
 1564: February 18 – Michelangelo (born 1475)

References

Architecture